Leonard Paul Howland (December 5, 1865 – December 23, 1942) was an American lawyer and politician who served three terms as a U.S. Representative from Ohio from 1907 to 1913.

Biography 
Paul Howland was born in Jefferson, Ohio. Howland completed preparatory studies. He graduated from Oberlin College (Ohio) in 1887 and from the law department of Harvard University in 1890. He was admitted to the bar in 1890 and commenced practice in Jefferson, Ohio. He moved to Cleveland in 1894 and continued the practice of law. He served as second lieutenant, squadron adjutant, First Regiment, Ohio Volunteer Cavalry, during the Spanish–American War.

Congress 
Howland was elected as a Republican to the Sixtieth, Sixty-first, and Sixty-second Congresses (March 4, 1907 – March 3, 1913). He was an unsuccessful candidate for reelection in 1912 to the Sixty-third Congress.

Later career 
He was one of the managers appointed by the House of Representatives in 1912 to conduct the impeachment proceedings against Robert W. Archbald, judge of the United States Commerce Court. He resumed the practice of law. He served as a delegate to the Republican National Conventions in 1916, 1920, and 1924.

Death 
He died in Cleveland, Ohio, December 23, 1942. He was interred in Lake View Cemetery.

Sources

1865 births
1942 deaths
Oberlin College alumni
Harvard Law School alumni
People from Jefferson, Ohio
Politicians from Cleveland
Burials at Lake View Cemetery, Cleveland
Ohio lawyers
American military personnel of the Spanish–American War
United States Army officers
Lawyers from Cleveland
Republican Party members of the United States House of Representatives from Ohio